Hymenoxys jamesii is a North American species of flowering plant in the daisy family known by the common name James's rubberweed. It has been found only on the Mogollon Plateau of Arizona in the southwestern United States.

Hymenoxys jamesii is a perennial herb up to 120 cm (4 feet) tall. One plant can produce sometimes as many as 330 flower heads in a branching array. Each head has 7–9 ray flowers and 30–75 tiny disc flowers.

References

External links

jamesii
Flora of Arizona
Plants described in 1993